Stephopoma is a genus of sea snails, marine gastropod molluscs in the family Siliquariidae, the "slit worm shells" or "slit worm snails".

Species
Species within the genus Stephopoma include:
 Stephopoma abrolhosense Bieler, 1997
 Stephopoma lacunosum (Barnard, 1963)
 Stephopoma levispinosum  
 Stephopoma mamillatum  Morton & Keen, 1960
 Stephopoma myrakeenae  Olsson & McGinty, 1958
 Stephopoma nucleocostatum May, 1915
 Stephopoma nucleogranosum Verco, 1904
 Stephopoma pennatum Mørch, 1860
 Stephopoma quincunx (Barnard, 1963)
 Stephopoma roseum (Quoy and Gaimard, 1834) 
 Stephopoma tricuspe  Mörch, 1861

References

 Rolán E., 2005. Malacological Fauna From The Cape Verde Archipelago. Part 1, Polyplacophora and Gastropoda.

Further reading 
 Powell A. W. B., New Zealand Mollusca, William Collins Publishers Ltd, Auckland, New Zealand 1979 

Siliquariidae